Hessdalen is a village in the municipality of Holtålen in Trøndelag county, Norway. About 150 people live in the village and surrounding valley.

The Hessdalen area is known for the occurrence of unexplained aerial luminous phenomena called the Hessdalen lights. The phenomenon is monitored by the Hessdalen AMS.

Name
The first element is the name of the local river Hesja and the last element is the definite form of dal, which means "dale" or "valley".

References

Holtålen
Valleys of Trøndelag
Villages in Trøndelag